Roman Jerala (born 1962) is a Slovenian biochemist and synthetic biologist, internationally best known as the leader of Slovenian teams that won the Grand prize at the International Genetically Engineered Machine competition several times.

Life
Jerala was born in Jesenice, a town in then People's Republic of Slovenia, FPR Yugoslavia. He completed his undergraduate studies and received a PhD at the University of Ljubljana. He was a postdoc at University of Virginia, Charlottesville, USA, in academic year 1994/1995.

He is now employed at the National Institute of Chemistry in Ljubljana, Slovenia, as the head of its Department of Synthetic Biology and Immunology and a full professor at the Faculty of Chemistry and Chemical technology, University of Ljubljana. Since 2009, he is synthetic biology project director at the Centre of Excellence EN-FIST.

Research
In 2013, Nature Chemical Biology published an article about Jerala's achievement that paves a path to designing and producing completely new protein shapes using reprogrammed bacteria by synthesizing protein that folds itself into a tetrahedron — a pyramid with a triangular base measuring just 5 nanometres along each edge - which can be used as container for delivering drugs on the nanoscale. Genetically modified Escherichia coli bacteria were drafted in to synthesize the protein.

Dek Woolfson, a biochemist from Centre for Nanoscience and Quantum Information, UK, described this kind of engineering with the following words:

Jerala's team is trying to double the size of the coiled coils in the tetrahedron, and thinking about making other shapes, such as prisms and bipyramids.

Awards
1991 Boris Kidrič Slovenian state award for science
2006 Grand Prize for the best project at the iGEM competition at MIT (team leader)
2007 finalist, Gold Medal, Best project in Health and Medicine at the iGEM competition at MIT (team leader)
2007 Prometheus of Science award by the Slovenian Science Foundation
2008 Grand prize winner at iGEM competition at MIT, Gold Medal, Best project in Health and Medicine (team leader)
2009 Pregl award by the National institute of chemistry for outstanding scientific achievements
2009 Zois award for outstanding scientific achievements (the highest national scientific award)
2010 Grand prize winner at iGEM competition at MIT, Best project in New Application Area, Best Engineered BioBrick (team leader)

In media
In 2011, Jerala was interviewed in Evening Guest talk show, aired by Slovenian National TV and hosted by Sandi Čolnik, one of the most recognizable Slovenian TV personalities.

References

1962 births
Living people
Slovenian biochemists
University of Ljubljana alumni
Academic staff of the University of Ljubljana
People from Jesenice, Jesenice
Synthetic biologists